Diplotaxini is a tribe in the May beetles and junebugs group, in the family Scarabaeidae. There is at least one genus and at least 150 described species in Diplotaxini.

A genus of Diplotaxini is Diplotaxis Kirby, 1837.

References

Further reading

 
 
 

Melolonthinae